Minnigaff is a village and civil parish in the historic county of Kirkcudbrightshire in Dumfries and Galloway,  Scotland. Lead was discovered there in 1763 and mined about two miles from the village until 1839.

Etymology
The name Minnigaff or Minigaff is of Brittonic origin. The generic element is mönïδ, meaning "a prominent hill", while the specific is goβ, meaning "a blacksmith" (c.f. Welsh mynydd-gof). The Minnigaff Hills, part of the Galloway Forest Park, are located north of the village.

History
Minnigaff was one of two parishes from Kirkcudbrightshire which were included in the Wigtown District which existed from 1975 to 1996, and as such forms part of the Wigtown lieutenancy area rather than the Stewartry of Kirkcudbright lieutenancy.

Notable people
Minnigaff is the birthplace of John M'Millan, the Cameronian preacher.  Sir James Mirrlees, winner of the 1996 Nobel Memorial Prize in Economic Sciences was also born there.

Buildings 
 List of listed buildings in Minnigaff, Dumfries and Galloway

References

Villages in Dumfries and Galloway
Parishes in Dumfries and Galloway